Jean-Paul Eale Lutula (born 4 October 1984) is a Congolese-Rwandan footballer who is currently playing for Qatari club Muaither.

Career
He has played for FC Brussels in the Belgian First Division and signed a loan contract in February 2010 with Chinese side Yanbian FC.

References

External links
 

1984 births
Living people
Footballers from Kinshasa
Rwandan footballers
Rwandan expatriate footballers
Rwanda international footballers
R.W.D.M. Brussels F.C. players
Yanbian Funde F.C. players
China League One players
Expatriate footballers in Belgium
Expatriate footballers in China
AS Vita Club players
Daring Club Motema Pembe players
Rwandan expatriate sportspeople in Belgium
Muaither SC players
Qatari Second Division players
Association football forwards
RWDM47 players
21st-century Democratic Republic of the Congo people
Dual internationalists (football)